Yosef (also transliterated as Yossef, Josef, Yoseph Tiberian Hebrew and Aramaic Yôsēp̄) is a Hebrew male name derived from the Biblical character Joseph. The name can also consist of the Hebrew yadah meaning "praise", "fame" and the word asaf. It is the Hebrew equivalent of the English name Joseph, and the Arabic name Yusuf.

The name appears in the Book of Genesis. Joseph is Jacob's eleventh son and Rachel's first son, and known in the Jewish Bible as Yossef ben-Yaakov.

In Christian culture, the name has the additional significance of being the name of Saint Joseph, described in the canonical gospels as the husband of Mary, mother of Jesus, and Jesus' legal father.

Given name
Yosef Ortiz Payes (2011-) American (Flavius Josephus), Jewish general and historian
Yossi Avni-Levy (1962–), Israeli writer and diplomat
Yossef Bodansky, Israeli-American political scientist
Yosef Asaf Borger, Israeli DJ, electronic music producer and rapper known as Borgore 
(Yosef) Joseph Caro (1488–1575), Spanish-Ottoman Talmid Chacham and author of the Shulchan Aruch
(Yossef) Joseph Cedar (1968–),  Israeli film director and screenwriter
(Yosef) Josy Eisenberg  (1933–2017), French television producer
Yosef Elboim, Israeli rabbi, founder and head of the Movement for the Establishment of the 3rd Jerusalem Temple 
Yosef Garfinkel (1956–), Israeli archaeologist
Yossef Gutfreund (1932–1972), Israeli wrestling judge
Yossef Harmelin (1922–1994), Austrian-Israeli civil servant and ambassador
Yosef Yozel Horwitz (1847–1919), "The Alter of Novardok", Belarusian rabbi 
Yosef Kapach (1917–2000), Yemenite scholar
Yosef Karduner (1969–, born Gilad Kardunos), Israeli Hasidic singer-songwriter
(Yossef) Joseph Klausner (1874–1958), Lithuanian-Israeli historian and professor of Hebrew literature
(Yosef) Joseph Kossonogi (1908–1981), Hungarian-Israeli painter
Yossef "Tommy" Lapid (1931–2008, born Tomislav Lampel), Hungarian-Israeli radio and television presenter, journalist, politician and government minister
Yosef Mizrachi (1968–), Israeli-American rabbi
Yosef Reinman, American rabbi and author
Yossef Romano (1940–1972), Israeli weightlifter, held hostage and killed during the Munich massacre by Palestinian terrorists 
Yosef Yitzchak Schneersohn (1880–1950), Sixth Chabad Rebbe
Yosef Tekoah (1925–1991), Israeli diplomat and President of the Ben-Gurion University of the Negev 
Yosef Weitz (1890–1972), Russian-Israeli director of the Land and Afforestation Department of the Jewish National Fund
(Yossef) Joseph Zaritsky (1891–1985), Russian-Israeli artist

Surname
Elie Yossef, Israeli-British educator and political activist
Jwan Yosef (1984–), Syrian-Swedish painter and artist 
Menasheh ben Yosef ben Yisrael (1604–1657), Portuguese rabbi, kabbalist, writer, diplomat, printer and publisher, founder of the first Hebrew printing press (named Emeth Me'erets Titzmah')
Ya'akov Yosef (1946–2013), Israeli rabbi and member of the Knesset

See also
Hebrew name
Joseph (given name)
Yusuf

References

Hebrew masculine given names
Hebrew-language surnames